John August Lins (October 3, 1840March 20, 1905) was a German American immigrant, businessman, and Republican politician.  He served four years in the Wisconsin State Senate (1885–1889) and one year in the Wisconsin State Assembly (1881), representing Waukesha County.  Earlier in his life, he was a Union Army volunteer, serving with the 5th Wisconsin Infantry Regiment through nearly the entire American Civil War.

Biography
Lins was born in Wachstedt, a small municipality in what is now the state of Thuringia in central Germany.  In 1857, then age 17, his family immigrated to the United States.  His family purchased a farm near Milwaukee, Wisconsin, where he worked and resided until 1859.  In 1859, he went to St. Louis, and then to New Orleans, where he remained until the outbreak of the American Civil War.  He returned to Milwaukee, and three days after his arrival, he volunteered for service in the Union Army.  He was enrolled in the 5th Wisconsin Infantry Regiment at Camp Randall, and, in July 1861, marched for the eastern theater of the war.  Battles he took part in include the Battle of Lee's Mill, the Battle of Williamsburg, the Battle of Savage's Station, the Battle of White Oak Swamp, the Battle of Malvern Hill, the Battle of Crampton's Gap, the Battle of Antietam, the Battle of Fredericksburg, the Battle of Gettysburg, the Battle of Spotsylvania Court House, as well as the Battle of Cold Harbor, during which he was severely injured. After the war, he resided at Eagle, Wisconsin, in Waukesha County.

Political career
Lins was elected to the Wisconsin State Assembly in 1880 from Waukesha County's 1st Assembly district.  The district at the time comprised the southern half of the county.  He did not run for re-election in 1881.  In 1884, he was elected to the Wisconsin State Senate from the 10th State Senate district, which then comprised all of Waukesha County.  He did not seek re-election in 1888.  During his term in the Senate, he was chairman of the committee on Town and County Organization in the 38th Legislature.

In addition to his state legislative offices, Lins was a member of the Board of Supervisors and Treasurer of Waukesha County.

Electoral history

Wisconsin Assembly (1880)

| colspan="6" style="text-align:center;background-color: #e9e9e9;"| General Election, November 2, 1880

Wisconsin Senate (1884)

| colspan="6" style="text-align:center;background-color: #e9e9e9;"| General Election, November 4, 1884

References

External links
 

1840 births
1905 deaths
Politicians from Milwaukee
People from Eagle, Wisconsin
County supervisors in Wisconsin
Republican Party Wisconsin state senators
Republican Party members of the Wisconsin State Assembly
People of Wisconsin in the American Civil War
Union Army soldiers
German emigrants to the United States
People from the Province of Saxony